Eurydema dominulus, also known by its common name painted bug, is a cabbage bug from the genus Eurydema.  The species was first described in 1911.

Description 
Eurydema dominulus is a cabbage bug that is vividly orange and black.

Range 
The bug is common in Japan and Europe.

Ecology 
The species is known as a pest for cruciferous vegetables, such as Chinese cabbage, Japanese radish and wasabi.

References

Strachiini

Insects described in 1911
Agricultural pest insects
Hemiptera of Europe
Insects of Japan